Ronnie Williams (April 29, 1962 – November 7, 2021) was an American professional basketball player. He played college basketball for the Florida Gators. Williams played professionally in the Continental Basketball Association (CBA) and United States Basketball League (USBL).

Early life
Williams attended St. John's Military Academy in Delafield, Wisconsin.

College career
Williams was recruited by Florida Gators assistant coach Monte Towe, who noticed Williams at a summer league tournament in Harlem during the late-1970s.

Williams was a four-time All-Southeastern Conference (SEC) selection and led the Gators in scoring each season he played. Williams holds the Gators' records in points, field goals made, free throws made and free throws attempted.

Suspension
Williams was suspended along with three teammates for the first month of the 1982–83 season due to a telephone fraud case. Williams, Vernon Delancy, Tony Rogers and Rodney Williams of the Florida Gators basketball team, along with Gators football player Lorenzo Hampton and sprinter Roger Dixon, were charged with making more than $1,600 in illegal telephone calls and placing them on the University Athletic Association's bill. The suspended players were required to repay the telephone company and maintain good behavior for one year.

Professional career
Williams was selected by the Boston Celtics as the 47th overall pick in the 1984 NBA draft but never played in the National Basketball Association (NBA). He played in the Continental Basketball Association for the Tampa Bay Thrillers, the Pensacola Tornados and the Mississippi Jets. After his first season in the CBA he was back with the Boston Celtics for the 1985–86 preseason, but was cut in early October 1985 by Celtics coach K. C. Jones.

Williams played with the Palm Beach Stingrays of the United States Basketball League (USBL) in 1987 and in 1988. He was released after one month with the team on June 22, 1988. Williams retired from playing basketball in 1988.

Personal life
After his playing career, Williams worked at a juvenile detention center in Brooklyn for over 20 years. He had six children.

Death
Williams died on November 7, 2021, in New York City after a two-year struggle with brain cancer.

Career statistics

College

|-
| style="text-align:left;"| 1980–81
| style="text-align:left;"| Florida
| 28 || – || 35.3 || .575 || – || .610 || 9.0 || 1.2 || .5 || 1.0 || 19.4
|-
| style="text-align:left;"| 1981–82
| style="text-align:left;"| Florida
| 27 || – || 36.8 || .597 || – || .728 || 8.2 || 1.3 || 1.1 || .6 || 21.3
|-
| style="text-align:left;"| 1982–83
| style="text-align:left;"| Florida
| 28 || 27 || 35.9 || .580 || – || .723 || 8.8 || 1.5 || 1.0 || 1.0 || 18.6
|-
| style="text-align:left;"| 1983–84
| style="text-align:left;"| Florida
| 27 || 27 || 34.9 || .586 || – || .716 || 8.7 || 1.7 || 1.0 || .6 || 16.6
|- class="sortbottom"
| style="text-align:center;" colspan="2"| Career
| 110 || 54 || 35.7 || .585 || – || .696 || 8.7 || 1.4 || .9 || .8 || 19.0

References

External links
College statistics
CBA statistics

1962 births
2021 deaths
20th-century African-American sportspeople
21st-century African-American people
African-American basketball players
American men's basketball players
Boston Celtics draft picks
Florida Gators men's basketball players
Jacksonville Jets (CBA) players
Mississippi Jets players
Pensacola Tornados (1985–86) players
Power forwards (basketball)
Sportspeople from Queens, New York
Basketball players from New York City
Tampa Bay Thrillers players
Deaths from brain cancer in the United States